The Heart of Maryland (play), 1895 play directed by David Belasco
The Heart of Maryland (1915 film), 1915 film based on the play, directed by Herbert Brenon
The Heart of Maryland (1921 film), 1921 film based on the play, directed by Tom Terriss
The Heart of Maryland (1927 film), 1927 film based on the play, directed by Lloyd Bacon